The veena is a plucked musical instrument originating from India.

Veena may also refer to:

Musical instruments
Rudra veena, plucked string instrument used in Hindustani music
Saraswati veena, plucked string instrument used in Carnatic music
Vichitra veena, plucked string instrument used in Hindustani music
Gottuvadhyam, plucked string instrument used in Carnatic music
Alapini veena, historical veena, stick zither
Ancient veena, an Indian arched harp
Eka-tantri veena, historical veena, tube zither
Kinnari veena, historical veena
Mohan veena, slide guitar
Triveni veena
Ranjan veena
Bobbili Veena
Misr veena

Male given name
Veena Kuppayyar (1798–1860), Indian exponent of Veena and composer of Carnatic music
Veena Venkatagiriyappa (1887–1961), Indian musician

Female given name
Veena (actress) (1926–2004) also known as Veena Kumari, Indian actress
Veena Das (born 1945), American professor of anthropology
Veena Dubal, American lawyer and scholar
Veena Goel (born 1981), American beauty queen
Veena Malik (born 1984 as Zahida Malik), Pakistani actress, model and comedian
Veena Misra, American engineer
Veena Talwar Oldenburg, Indian-born American history professor
Veena Rawat, Canadian electrical engineer
Veena Sahajwalla, Australian scientist and inventor
Veena Sahasrabuddhe (1948–2016), Indian vocalist and composer of Hindustani classical music
Veena Sud, Canadian-born American television writer, director, and producer
Veena Verma (born 1960), UK-based Punjabi short-story writer

Music label
Veena Music, a regional music label based in Rajasthan, India

See also

Beena (disambiguation)
Vina (disambiguation)